Roydon Frederick Nurse is a New Zealand rugby league player who represented New Zealand.

Playing career
Nurse played for the Ponsonby United side in the late 1930s and early 1940s before transferring to the Mount Albert Lions in the Auckland Rugby League competition and also represented Auckland Pakehā in several matches against Auckland Māori and Auckland.

Nurse played one test match for New Zealand in 1946, becoming Kiwi number 286. The test was against the touring Great Britain Lions, and New Zealand won 13-8.

References

Living people
New Zealand rugby league players
New Zealand national rugby league team players
Auckland rugby league team players
Ponsonby Ponies players
Mount Albert Lions players
Rugby league wingers
Year of birth missing (living people)